Princess Anne Eleonore of Hesse-Darmstadt (30 July 1601 – 6 May 1659) was the daughter of Louis V, Landgrave of Hesse-Darmstadt and Magdalena von Brandenburg. She was born in Darmstadt, Hesse, Germany.

She married George, Duke of Brunswick-Lüneburg on 14 December 1617 in Darmstadt. One of their sons was Ernest Augustus, Elector of Brunswick-Lüneburg (1629–1698), father of George I of Great Britain.

She died at Herzberg Castle in Lower Saxony, Germany at the age of 57.

Issue

Magdalene (b. & d. 9 August 1620)
Christian Ludwig (1622–1665), Prince of Calenberg 1641–1648, Prince of Lüneburg 1648-1665
Georg Wilhelm (1624–1705), Prince of Calenberg 1648–1665, Prince of Lüneburg 1665-1705
Johann Friedrich (1625–1679), Prince of Calenberg 1665-1679
Sophie Amalie (1628–1685), married King Frederick III of Denmark
Dorothea Magdalene (1629-17 November 1630)
Ernst Augustus (1629–1698), Prince of Calenberg 1679–1698, father of King George I of Great Britain
Anna Marie Eleonore (20 November 1630 – 13 November 1636)

References

Duchesses of Brunswick-Lüneburg
Hesse-Darmstadt, Anne Eleonore of
Hesse-Darmstadt, Anne Eleonore of
Hesse-Darmstadt, Anne Eleonore of
Hesse-Darmstadt, Anne Eleonore of
Landgravines of Hesse-Darmstadt
New House of Lüneburg
Daughters of monarchs